is The Brilliant Green's third single, released on May 13, 1998. It was their first number-one single on the Oricon charts. It was used as the drama Love Again's theme song.

Glim Spanky covered the song on the February 17, 2018, episode of the BS-TBS TV show Sound Inn "S", a recording of which was included on certain editions of their May 9, 2018, single "All of Us".

Track listing

References

1998 singles
The Brilliant Green songs
Oricon Weekly number-one singles
Japanese television drama theme songs
Songs written by Tomoko Kawase
Songs written by Shunsaku Okuda
1998 songs